Chevreulia is a genus of plants in the family Asteraceae, described as a genus in 1817.

The genus is native to South America (Brazil, Bolivia, Ecuador, Argentina) and the Falkland Islands.

Species

References 

Asteraceae genera
Gnaphalieae